New Hutton is a civil parish in the South Lakeland District of Cumbria, England. It contains 12 listed buildings that are recorded in the National Heritage List for England.  All the listed buildings are designated at Grade II, the lowest of the three grades, which is applied to "buildings of national importance and special interest".  The parish contains the village of New Hutton, and is otherwise rural.  The listed buildings include farmhouses, farm buildings, houses, one of which is used as a school, a monument, a church and associated structures, and a dam and machinery house.


Buildings

References

Citations

Sources

Lists of listed buildings in Cumbria